Hollomon is a surname. Notable people with the surname include:
 
Gus Hollomon (born 1945), American football defensive back
John Herbert Hollomon Jr. (1919–1985), American engineer known for
Hollomon–Jaffe parameter
Zener–Hollomon parameter

See also
Holloman (surname)